Caernarvon railway station was a station on the former Bangor and Carnarvon Railway between Caernarfon, Gwynedd and Menai Suspension Bridge near Bangor. The station was closed to all traffic in January 1972. The station has since been demolished and the site redeveloped.

History
The station, which opened on 1 July 1852, was named "Carnarvon". The town was originally the terminus of the branch line from Menai bridge; later becoming part of the Carnarvonshire Railway. In 1864 the Carnarvon and Llanberis Railway extended the branch line  from Carnarvon station to Llanberis. A  tunnel was constructed just south of the station to carry the new line. The tunnel was reopened in 1995 as a road tunnel.

By 1871 all three original companies were absorbed into the London and North Western Railway. The station was renamed "Caernarvon" on 27 March 1926. In 1964 the lines to Afon Wen and Llanberis were closed under the Beeching Axe.

On 5 January 1970, Caernarvon was closed to all services. However following a fire that destroyed the Britannia Bridge over the Menai Straits on 23 May 1970, the branch and goods yard were temporarily reopened for freight traffic until 30 January 1972. The branch line to Caernarvon station was finally closed with the resumption of rail services to Anglesey and Holyhead in February 1972. The track was removed and the station completely demolished. A Morrisons store now occupies the site, having been built under Safeway in the late 80's and opened by the mayor of Caernarfon, and then absorbed into Morrisons after they acquired Safeway in 2004.

Present
The Welsh Highland Railway (WHR) now operates from Caernarfon railway station which uses the original trackbed of the Carnarvonshire Railway just south of the tunnel on St Helen's Road beneath the high retaining walls of Segontium Terrace.

Caernarfon Council have a longer-term plan to reinstate the rail transport link to Bangor. After speculation that the WHR would at some point in time extended itself to Bangor, owner the Ffestiniog Railway wrote to the council in January 2014 to confirm that they would not themselves be supportive of such a scheme in narrow gauge, but supported the reconnection of the town to the national rail network using standard gauge.

References

Sources

Further material

External links
 The station site on a navigable OS Map, via National Library of Scotland
 The station and line, via Rail Map Online
 The line BCN with mileages, via Railway Codes
 Images of Caernarfon stations, via Yahoo
 The station and line, via LNWR Society
 Caernarfon station, via Disused Stations
 Caernarfon Town Line, via Disused Stations
 By DMU from Pwllheli to Amlwch, via Huntley Archives

Beeching closures in Wales
Disused railway stations in Gwynedd
History of Caernarfonshire
Railway stations in Great Britain opened in 1852
Railway stations in Great Britain closed in 1970
Former London and North Western Railway stations
Caernarfon
1852 establishments in Wales